The canton of La Châtaigneraie is an administrative division of the Vendée department, western France. Its borders were modified at the French canton reorganisation which came into effect in March 2015. Its seat is in La Châtaigneraie.

It consists of the following communes:
 
Antigny
Bazoges-en-Pareds
Bourneau
La Caillère-Saint-Hilaire
Cezais
La Chapelle-Thémer
La Châtaigneraie
Cheffois
L'Hermenault
La Jaudonnière
Loge-Fougereuse
Marillet
Marsais-Sainte-Radégonde
Menomblet
Mouilleron-Saint-Germain
Petosse
La Réorthe
Saint-Aubin-la-Plaine
Saint-Cyr-des-Gâts
Sainte-Hermine
Saint-Étienne-de-Brillouet
Saint-Hilaire-de-Voust
Saint-Jean-de-Beugné
Saint-Juire-Champgillon
Saint-Laurent-de-la-Salle
Saint-Martin-des-Fontaines
Saint-Martin-Lars-en-Sainte-Hermine
Saint-Maurice-des-Noues
Saint-Maurice-le-Girard
Saint-Pierre-du-Chemin
Saint-Sulpice-en-Pareds
Saint-Valérien
Sérigné
Terval
Thiré
Thouarsais-Bouildroux
Vouvant

References

Cantons of Vendée